Valley of Fire is a state park in Nevada, United States.

It may also refer to:
 Valley of Fire (album), a 2023 album by El Ten Eleven
 Valley of Fire (film), a 1951 American Western film